The Great Unravel is the third studio album by folk rock group Gandalf Murphy and the Slambovian Circus of Dreams.

Track listing
"Desire" – 3:42
"Pushin' Up Daisies" – 4:03
"Julia" – 4:32
"Tink (I Know It's You)" – 5:14
"Clear Channel" – 2:58
"Summer's Day" – 3:23
"The Great Unravel" – 3:47
"Picture" – 4:20
"Bobby's Kinda Dumb" – 2:15
"Everyone Has A Broken Heart" – 4:16
"Light A Way" - 3:54
"Forever & A Day Like This" - 4:55
"Naniwan" (Hidden Track) - Bonus 'Ancient Murphy' track - 3:15

All songs by Joziah Longo.
Produced by Sharkey McEwen.

See also
 

2008 albums
Gandalf Murphy and the Slambovian Circus of Dreams albums